Christina Hansen may refer to:

 Christina Roslyng Christiansen (born 1978), Danish handball player
 Christina Hansen (footballer) (born 1970), Danish footballer
 Christina Aistrup Hansen (born 1985), Danish nurse